Leipzig-Miltitz station is a railway station in Leipzig, the largest city in Saxony, Germany, located in the Miltitz district, in the west of the city.

References

Miltitz
Miltitz